Bompas & Parr was founded June 2007 by Sam Bompas and Harry Parr and creates food art using gelatin desserts, colloquially called jellies. Named after the defunct food company of the same name, the company uses food moulds to make edible decorations shaped like buildings and other architectural structures.

The work of Bompas & Parr has been noted for its detail and the company has competed in culinary artwork competitions, an example being the Architectural Jelly Design Competition organised for the London Festival of Architecture. The company claims their projects explore how the taste of food is altered through synaesthesia, performance and setting. Currently the focus of their projects is gelatin-based because they feel it is a perfect medium for an examination of food and architecture due to its plastic form and the historic role it has played in exploring notions of taste.

Bompas & Parr also claim to be the first group to ever record the sound of jelly wobbling.

Projects have included a glow-in-the-dark alcoholic jelly for Mark Ronson's 33rd Birthday Party. and a Willy Wonka-style chewing gum that changed flavour as you chew.

In July 2011, Bompas & Parr designed a public art installation on the roof terrace of Selfridges, Oxford Street, for a promotional event. The first time that the roof had been opened to the public since World War II, the company designed a rowing lake, which was dyed green.

As part of the nationwide activity marking the London 2012 Open Weekend Bompas & Parr created scratch and sniff cards to accompany a one-off scratch and sniff screening of Bill Forsyth's film Gregory's Girl in Edinburgh's Festival Square on Sunday 26 July 2009. This is thought to be the first outdoor scratch and sniff experience anywhere in the UK. An enigmatic penguin (familiar to devotees of the film) appeared amongst the crowd holding up a placard instructing the audience to scratch and sniff at the right moment.

On 30 July 2015 at Borough Market the company took over an ancient monastery next to the market for a pop up named Alcoholic Architecture. Visitors consumed vapourised alcohol through their skin, eyes and lungs in an immersive, multi sensory environment. .

References

http://bompasandparr.com/

External links
Bompas & Parr: Jellymongers

Brand name desserts
Food manufacturers of the United Kingdom